Reaney is a surname, and may refer to:

 Gilbert Reaney (1924–2008), English musicologist
 James Reaney (1926–2008), Canadian poet and playwright 
 Les Reaney (born 1984), Canadian ice hockey player
 Paul Reaney (born 1944), English footballer
 Thomas Reaney, British footballer

See also
Reaney, Son & Archbold, 19th-century American shipbuilding company